Mugisha Godfrey  (born 23 October 1978) is a former Ugandan footballer who played as a right midfielder and supporting striker. Godfrey has mostly played as a winger. He represented Uganda at under-17, under-19 and under-21, under-23, and the senior national team the Cranes. He was meant to play for the under-23 team (All Africa's games) in South Africa but he was dropped due to a hamstring injury. He was instrumental in leading KCC F.C to their first ever African champions league semi-final.

He moved to the United States of America in 2000 to attend college, and graduated with a degree in information systems and graphic design. He was first team all conference 2002, 2003, and MVP regional XII 2003, and All American honourable mention 2003. During his senior year 2004/05 he was invited to the Chicago Storm tryouts, a professional indoor soccer team. At the time he was about to graduate so he could not be signed.

References

External links
Thelondoneveningpost.com
Newvision.co.ug
Coachesacrosscontinents.org

Ugandan footballers
1978 births
Living people
Association football midfielders
Uganda international footballers